Trichophyton is a genus of fungi, which includes the parasitic varieties that cause tinea, including athlete's foot, ringworm, jock itch, and similar  infections of the nail, beard, skin and scalp. Trichophyton fungi are molds characterized by the development of both smooth-walled macro- and microconidia. Macroconidia are mostly borne laterally directly on the hyphae or on short pedicels, and are thin- or thick-walled, clavate to fusiform, and range from 4 to 8 by 8 to 50 μm in size. Macroconidia are few or absent in many species. Microconidia are spherical, pyriform to clavate or of irregular shape, and range from 2 to 3 by 2 to 4 μm in size.

Species and their habitat preference
According to current classification, the genus includes anthropophilic and zoophilic species. Anthropophilic fungi prefer to infect humans. Zoophilic fungi prefer to infect animals other than humans. Humans and animals are natural reservoirs for parasitic or dermatophytic fungi.

Other accepted species;

 Trichophyton ajelloi 
 Trichophyton areolatum 
 Trichophyton balcaneum 
 Trichophyton batonrougei 
 Trichophyton brumptii 
 Trichophyton candelabrum 
 Trichophyton cerebriforme 
 Trichophyton circonvolutum 
 Trichophyton denticulatum 
 Trichophyton depressum 
 Trichophyton farinulentum 
 Trichophyton fischeri 
 Trichophyton flavescens 
 Trichophyton floriforme 
 Trichophyton fluviomuniense 
 Trichophyton fuligineum 
 Trichophyton glabrum 
 Trichophyton gloriae 
 Trichophyton gourvilii 
 Trichophyton guzzonii 
 Trichophyton immergens 
 Trichophyton indicum 
 Trichophyton kanei 
 Trichophyton krajdenii 
 Trichophyton kuryangei 
 Trichophyton longifusum 
 Trichophyton louisianicum 
 Trichophyton mariatii 
 Trichophyton megninii 
 Trichophyton milochevitchii 
 Trichophyton multicolor 
 Trichophyton oceanicum 
 Trichophyton ochoterenai 
 Trichophyton olexae 
 Trichophyton pedis 
 Trichophyton plurizoniforme 
 Trichophyton pratense 
 Trichophyton proliferans 
 Trichophyton pseudotonsurans 
 Trichophyton purpureum  
 Trichophyton radicosum 
 Trichophyton raubitschekii 
 Trichophyton rotundum 
 Trichophyton sabouraudii 
 Trichophyton sarkisovii 
 Trichophyton spadix 
 Trichophyton teheraniense 
 Trichophyton tenuishyphum 
 Trichophyton vanbreuseghemii

Mating and meiosis
Trichophyton mentagrophytes (Family Arthrodermataceae, Genus Trichophyton) is capable of both mating and meiosis.

Effect on humans
The anthropophilic varieties cause forms of dermatophytosis, that is, fungal infection of the skin.  They are keratinophilic: they feed on the keratin in nails, hair, and dead skin.

Trichophyton concentricum causes "Malabar itch", a skin infection consisting of an eruption of a number of concentric rings of overlapping scales forming papulosquamous patches.

Trichophyton rubrum and Trichophyton interdigitale cause athlete's foot (tinea pedis), toenail fungal infections (a.k.a. tinea unguium, a.k.a. onychomycosis), crotch itch (a.k.a. tinea cruris), and ringworm (a misnomer, as there is no worm involved; it is also known as tinea corporis). Trichophyton schoenleinii cause favus (tinea capitis),Trichophyton mentagrophytes var. mentagrophytes and Trichophyton verrucosum cause kerion (violent reaction results from infection with an animal dermatophytes). Fungal folliculitis is a rare hair follicle infection induced overwhelmingly by Trichophyton, which can be spread zoonotically. The fungi can easily spread to other areas of the body as well and to the host's home environs (socks, shoes, clothes, showers, bathtubs, counters, floors, carpets, etc.).

They can be transmitted by direct contact, by contact with infested particles (of dead skin, nails, hair) shed by the host, and by contact with the fungi's spores. These fungi thrive in warm moist dark environments, such as in the dead upper layers of skin between the toes of a sweaty foot inside a tightly enclosed shoe, or in dead skin particles on the wet floor of a communal (shared) shower. Their spores are extremely difficult to eliminate, and spread everywhere.

When the hyphae of the fungi burrow into the skin and release enzymes to digest keratin, they may irritate nerve endings and cause the host to itch, which may elicit the scratch reflex, which directs the host to scratch.  Scratching directly transfers fungi and dead skin particles that are infested with the fungi to the fingers and under the finger nails.  From there they can be transmitted to other parts of the host's body when the host touches or scratches those. Scratching also damages skin layers, making it easier for the fungi to spread at the site of the infection.  If the fungi and infested debris are not washed from the fingers and fingernails soon enough, the fungi can also infect the skin of the fingers (tinea manuum), and burrow underneath and into the material of the fingernails (tinea unguium).  If left untreated, the fungi continue to grow and spread.

Treatments
A variety of zoophilic and anthropophilic dermatophyte treatments have varying levels of success based on species type. Treatments may take up to six months.

References

External links
Doctor Fungus
Mycology Unit at the Adelaide Women's and Children's Hospital 

Parasitic fungi
Arthrodermataceae
Cat diseases
Eurotiomycetes genera